Bogdan Rața (born January 22, 1984) is a Romanian sculptor best known for his twisted, contorted and  mutated versions of the human body. Rață lives and works in Timișoara and Bucharest.

Education
Rața studied sculpture at the West University of Timișoara (2003–2006). In 2008 he got his M.A. in sculpture at the Bucharest National University of Arts and in 2012 his PhD at the West University of Timișoara.

Work

In his early years of Rața's artistic work he used his own body as a model. Subsequently, he continued his work in the form of large-scale studies of different body fragments; with quasi-surgical accuracy, he carved out his arms, feet, elbows and torsos, which he later juxtaposed, juggling with sometimes oversized proportions such as Handgun, exhibited in Bucharest and later in Paris at the Farideh Cadot Gallery. The combinations give rise to new forms, hybrid and often "absurd" sculptures.

Rața is focused mainly on human anatoforms. Using polyester, paint, metal and synthetic resin he twists, deforms and shapes human bodies forming hybrid and grotesque anatomic mutations.

His works represents deformed and hideous human bodies or parts of it.  Rața is interested in the issues of perception and human figure in sculpture:

I work with human fragments which I combine in order to create images with a strong emotional impact: frustration, fright, shame. I reinterpret the human body precisely in order to induce a state of confusion to the reader and to in a way force him to understand, from a different perspective, the contemporary human being. A finger can be stronger than a rifle, an ear more frustrating than an interrogation.

Often, he mixes different body parts like fingers, foot, head and torsos: Punk (2008), Torsso (2008), Lonely (2011), The Cure (2010), Tits (2010), The Middle Way (2014), The Pressure (2015) etc. He also uses twisted trunks or faceless bodies: Shame (2009), Trying to Keep Life (2012) and The Lake (2015).

Teaching
Besides his artistic career, Rața is also a lecturer at the West University of Timișoara.

Exhibitions
Since 2007, Rața's work has been exhibited both nationally, in Timișoara, Bucharest, Sibiu, Baia Mare and internationally in Liverpool (UK), Paris (France), New York (U.S.), Moscow and St. Petersburg (Russia), Venice (Italy), Tel Aviv (Israel), Cascais (Portugal) and Budapest (Hungary).

References

External links 
 Cosmin Nasui Gallery: Bogdan Rața
 Artsy: Bogdan Rața
 

Modern sculptors
1984 births
Living people
People from Baia Mare
20th-century Romanian sculptors
Bucharest National University of Arts alumni
West University of Timișoara alumni